Brandon Ray Stokley (born June 23, 1976) is a former American football wide receiver and current radio personality. He was drafted by the Baltimore Ravens in the fourth round of the 1999 NFL Draft. He played college football at University of Louisiana at Lafayette.

Stokley also played for the Indianapolis Colts, Seattle Seahawks, New York Giants, and Denver Broncos, earning three Super Bowl wins during his career.

Personal life

His father, Nelson Stokley, played college football at LSU and was the head coach of the Louisiana–Lafayette Ragin' Cajuns from 1986 to 1998.  Brandon played wide receiver under his father from 1994 to 1997, with Jake Delhomme as quarterback through the 1996 season.

While in college, Stokely met his future wife, Lana, a two-time All-America left fielder in softball who led Southwestern Louisiana to two College World Series. The couple have two sons.

Early years

Stokley attended Comeaux High School (Lafayette, Louisiana) and was a letterman in football, basketball, and baseball. In football, Stokley won All-District 3-A honors, All-Parish honors, All-Acadiana honors, and All-State Class 5-A honors. In basketball, Stokley averaged 14 points a game and won All-District honors. In baseball, he won All-District honors.

College career

Brandon Stokley was a four-year letterman for the Ragin’ Cajun football team from 1995-1998. During his career as a wide receiver, Stokley had three 1,000+ yard seasons and was the first player in NCAA Division I-A to average 100 yards per game over a four-year career.

Stokley is the all-time UL Lafayette leader in passes caught at 241, reception yardage at 3,702 and touchdown receptions with 25.

Professional career

First stint with Baltimore Ravens
Stokley was drafted by the Baltimore Ravens out of the University of Louisiana at Lafayette, then named the University of Southwestern Louisiana, in the fourth round (105th pick overall) of the 1999 NFL Draft.  Stokley won a championship ring in Super Bowl XXXV (2001) as a member of the Ravens.  In the game, he caught 3 passes for 52 yards, including the first touchdown of the game—a 38-yard touchdown reception in the first quarter.

Indianapolis Colts
In 2003, Stokley signed with the Indianapolis Colts. On December 26, 2004, Stokley received the record-breaking 21-yard touchdown pass for Peyton Manning in the hunt to break Dan Marino's record of 48 touchdown passes in a season. That year, he had a breakout season with 68 passes caught for 1,077 yards and 10 touchdowns and an average of 15.8 yards per catch. Furthermore, the TD catch made the 2004 Colts the first NFL team to have three WRs with 1,000 receiving yards and 10 touchdowns or more in a season, the other two being Reggie Wayne and Marvin Harrison. The next two seasons of Stokley's career were marred by various injuries. After he participated in only four games of the 2006 season, the Colts terminated his contract on March 1, 2007. Stokley earned his second Super Bowl ring after the Colts won Super Bowl XLI (2007) against the Chicago Bears, even though he wasn't able to play in the game due to injury.

First stint with Denver Broncos
On March 14, 2007, Stokley signed with the Denver Broncos. On December 7, 2007, he signed a 3-year extension with the team. In a memorable play from the Broncos' 2009 season opener, Stokley caught a pass intended for teammate Brandon Marshall that was tipped by Cincinnati Bengal Leon Hall, and took it 87 yards into the end zone for the winning score. As he reached the 5-yard line, he abruptly changed direction and ran parallel to the goal line, running an additional six seconds off the clock, only crossing into the end zone once he reached the opposite side of the field. This ensured a win for the Broncos, who were trailing the Cincinnati Bengals 7–6 with 28 seconds left before Stokley's touchdown reception.  Stokley attributed the clock-burning run to having done so in video games "probably hundreds of times", and it can be seen in the introduction of Madden NFL 11. With Stokley's touchdown, the final score was 12–7 and the Broncos got their first 2009 regular season win. The play was also memorable for play-by-play commentator Gus Johnson's call.

On September 4, 2010, Stokley was released by the Broncos.

Seattle Seahawks
On September 28, 2010, Stokley signed with the Seattle Seahawks. His most notable contribution in Seattle came in the 2010 NFL Playoffs against the New Orleans Saints and the Chicago Bears. In those games, Stokley was the leading receiver for Seattle, catching four passes for 73 yards and a touchdown against New Orleans and 8 catches for 86 yards and a touchdown against Chicago. His performance was one of the keys to the 7-9 Seahawks' surprise upset of the defending Super Bowl champion New Orleans Saints. He was later cut by the Seahawks after the 2011 lockout ended. During free agency he expressed interest in the Washington Redskins but never signed with them.

New York Giants
On September 15, 2011, Stokley signed with the New York Giants. After catching 1 pass in two games, he was released by the team with an injury settlement on October 4. The Giants went on to win Super Bowl XLVI at the end of the season.

Second stint with Broncos
On April 16, 2012, Stokley agreed to a one-year contract to return to the Denver Broncos, reuniting him with his former quarterback, Peyton Manning. Stokley went on to have one of his most productive seasons in several years, ending the year with 45 receptions, 544 receiving yards, and 5 touchdowns.

Second stint with Ravens
On August 10, 2013, Stokley agreed to terms with the Baltimore Ravens, reuniting him with the team that drafted him in 1999. On August 11, Stokley officially signed a one-year deal with the Ravens.
On October 5, the Ravens cut Stokley, and on October 8, the Ravens re-signed Stokley. Stokley suffered a concussion in a Week 14 victory over the Minnesota Vikings and was subsequently placed on injured reserve, ending his season.
On December 26, Stokley announced his decision to retire from professional football after the season.

NFL career statistics

Radio career
After his playing career ended, he went into sports radio.  He co-hosts with Zach Bye weekdays from 11am to 2pm MST on 104.3 The Fan, a radio station in Denver.

References

External links
 

1976 births
Living people
American football wide receivers
Baltimore Ravens players
Denver Broncos players
Indianapolis Colts players
Louisiana Ragin' Cajuns football players
New York Giants players
Seattle Seahawks players
People from Blacksburg, Virginia
Players of American football from Virginia